Track & Field, also known as  in Japan and Europe, is a 1983 Olympic-themed sports video game developed by Konami for arcades. The Japanese release sported an official license for the 1984 Summer Olympics. In Europe, the game was initially released under the Japanese title Hyper Olympic in 1983, before re-releasing under the US title Track & Field in early 1984.

Players compete in a series of events, most involving alternately pressing two buttons as quickly as possible to make the onscreen character run faster. It has a horizontal side-scrolling format, depicting one or two tracks at a time, a large scoreboard that displays world records and current runs, and a packed audience in the background.

The game was a worldwide commercial success in arcades, becoming one of the most successful arcade games of 1984. Konami and Centuri also held a 1984 Track & Field video game competition that drew more than a million players internationally, holding the record for the largest organized video game competition of all time . It was followed by sequels, including Hyper Sports, and similar Olympic video games from other companies. It led to a resurgence of arcade sports games and inspired Namco's side-scrolling platform game Pac-Land (1984).

Gameplay
In the original arcade game, the player uses two "run" buttons (or a trackball in later units that replaced buttons damaged from overuse) and one "action" button to control an athlete competing in the following six events: 
100 meter dash – running by quickly alternating button presses;
Long jump – running by alternating button press and correct timing for jump  hold jump button to set angle (42 degrees is optimal);
Javelin throw – running by alternating button presses and then using action button correct timing for angle (43 degrees is optimal);
110 meter hurdles – running by alternating button presses and using action button to time jumps;
Hammer throw – spinning initiated by pressing a run button once and then correctly timed press of action button to choose angle (45 degrees is optimal);
High jump – running (speed set by computer) and then action button must be held down to determine angle of jump  once in the air, the run button can be rapidly pressed for additional height.

In each event, there is a qualifying time or level that the player must achieve to advance to the next event; failing to qualify (in one heat for running events or three tries in the other events) will reduce the player's number of lives by one, but if none are present in his/her disposal, the game will end. Players earn extra lives per 100,000 points scored.

The game can accommodate up to four players, who compete in pairs for the running events and individually for the others. If there are fewer than four players, the remaining slots are played by the computer (or player "CPU"). In all multiplayer heats, though, the relative performances of the players have no effect on the game, and advancing is based solely on qualifying times. While most multiplayer arcade games had each set of controls relative to the players going from left to right, this game (which has two sets of controls) had a somewhat different setup. The left set of controls were for players 2 and 4, while the right set was for players 1 and 3. This is one of the few classic arcade games where single player mode was played on the right set of controls rather than the left. If a player completes all six events after a brief medal ceremony, he or she is sent back to the field for another round, with higher qualifying levels, however the game can be configured to conclude after the final event.

Because the game responded to repeatedly pressing the "run" buttons at high frequency, players of the arcade version resorted to various tricks such as rapidly swiping a coin or ping-pong ball over the buttons, or using a metal ruler which was repeated struck such that it would vibrate and press the buttons. As a result, arcade operators reported high rates of damage to the buttons and later versions had modifications to prevent such actions.

Release
Hyper Olympic was introduced at Tokyo's Amusement Machine Show (AM Show) in September 1983. Despite the hype for laserdisc games prior to the show, Hyper Olympic ended up being the most well-received game at the show. According to Cash Box magazine, several people claimed there were "cursory similarities" to Activision Decathlon, which was introduced a month earlier. Hyper Olympic was licensed to Centuri for North American distribution. However, Atari had been chosen as the official Olympics video game sponsor, so Centuri were unable to keep the title Hyper Olympic. It was subsequently introduced in North America as Track & Field at the Amusement & Music Operators Association (AMOA) show in October 1983. Despite the hype for laserdisc games prior to the show, many operators and distributors ended up considering Track & Field to be the biggest hit at the event.

Ports
Konami licensed the North American home video game rights to Atari, Inc. They initially ported Track & Field to the Atari 2600 console and the Atari 8-bit family, followed by versions for the Apple II and the Commodore 64 on the Atarisoft label. A port for the Atari 5200, identical to the Atari 8-bit computer version, was cancelled. The 2600 version was among the new games to use Atari's "super chip" technology, enabling enhanced graphics and gameplay variety compared to what was previously possible on the 2600.

When Konami ported Track & Field to the Famicom (as Hyper Olympic), they only included four out of six events. Afterwards, they converted Hyper Sports to the Famicom as well, this time including three of the Hyper Sports events and one more event from Track & Field. By the time the NES gained popularity in the United States, Konami retooled the game for release in America by including all eight events from both games in one cartridge. Of the original six events from Track & Field, only the hammer throw is missing; in its place, however, are skeet shooting, archery, and triple jump.

The ZX Spectrum and Amstrad CPC versions were only released as part of the Game, Set and Match II compilation in 1988, and are poorly regarded.

The NES version of Track & Field was re-released in Europe in 1992 as Track & Field in Barcelona by Kemco in the light of the 1992 Summer Olympics. The opening song for the NES version is the Chariots of Fire theme by Vangelis (which was also used in the arcade version's high score screen).

Reception
In Japan, Game Machine listed Hyper Olympic as the top-grossing new table arcade cabinet in December 1983, and then the top-grossing tablet cabinet in January 1984. The game sold 38,000 arcade hardware units in Japan by the end of 1983. Track & Field was also a hit in North America. Despite requiring physical interaction from players, the game enjoyed continued success in North America throughout the first half of 1984. It topped the US RePlay upright arcade cabinet charts in February 1984 and May 1984, and was the top-grossing arcade game of June 1984. It went on to become the third highest-grossing arcade game of 1984 in the United States. In Europe, it was the highest-grossing arcade game of 1984 in the United Kingdom.

The arcade game received positive reviews upon release. Gene Lewin of Play Meter magazine scored it 8 out of 10, but said it would be "a definite 10" if released as a more affordable conversion kit. The review called it the best dedicated arcade game at the AMOA 1983 show and praised the gameplay, "excellent" graphics, "fantastic" sound, and originality, stating that having "different track and field events is an original idea" and "certainly different than the other sports games based on baseball, football or basketball." Computer and Video Games called it a "great game for all you armchair sports enthusiasts" but said it could cause a cramped finger.

Reviews for the home conversions varied depending on the platforms. Computer Entertainer reviewed the Atari 2600 version in 1984, scoring it 7 out of 8 stars. David M. Wilson and Johnny L. Wilson reviewed the home computer conversions for Computer Gaming World, and stated that "the game is primarily a joystick buster". Stuart Campbell, writing in Your Sinclair in 1992, considered the Spectrum version to be one of the worst games ever released for the machine.

In 1996, Next Generation listed the Track & Field series collectively as number 78 on their "Top 100 Games of All Time", remarking: "OK, so the games' play style has little to do with skill at (or even knowledge of) the actual sports. But so what? In a test of pure button pushing endurance, nothing can beat Track and Field, especially when you play with four players". In 1995, Flux magazine ranked the arcade version 65th in its "Top 100 Video Games."

Competition
In 1984, Konami and Centuri jointly held an international Track & Field video game competition that drew more than a million players from across Japan and North America. Play Meter in 1984 called it "the coin-op event of the year" and an "event on a scale never before achieved in the industry." , it holds the record for the largest organized video game competition of all time, according to Guinness World Records. The Twin Galaxies' Official Video Game & Pinball Book of World Records - Arcade Volume, lists history's largest video game contest as the "1984 March of Dimes International Konami/Centuri Track & Field Challenge". The editors said: "More than 1 million contestants played Track & Field between April 30 and May 26, hoping to be among three finalists going to Japan to represent the USA. As a fundraiser for the March of Dimes, the event was held in Aladdin's Castle arcades and National Convenience Stores. Gary West of Oklahoma City won the U.S. Finals, but Phil Britt, of Riverside, California, won the World Championship in Tokyo on June 10, 1984".

On December 18, 2008, Héctor Rodriguez, of California, USA, scored a world record 95,350 points.  Rodriguez beat the 23-year-old record of 95,040 points set on June 30, 1985 by Kelly Kobashigawa, of Los Angeles, during Twin Galaxies' 1985 Video Game Masters Tournament in Victoria, British Columbia, Canada.

Legacy

Impact
While not the first Olympic track-and-field game (it was preceded by Olympic Decathlon in 1980 and Activision Decathlon in August 1983), Track & Field spawned other similar Olympic video games following its release. For example, Ocean Software adapted the gameplay format into Daley Thompson's Decathlon (1984). Epyx released its own multi-event collection as Summer Games, then Summer Games II. Dinamic published Video Olimpic for the ZX Spectrum in 1984. Bandai's entry was Stadium Events for the NES in 1986.

Track & Field had an impact on the wider sports video game genre, leading a resurgence for the genre in arcades during the 1980s. Following the release of Track & Field, the arcade industry began producing sports games at levels not seen since the days of Pong and its clones nearly a decade earlier. Sports video games became popular after Track & Field, with a number of successful arcade sports games in 1984, including Nintendo's boxing game Punch-Out, the Nintendo VS. System titles Vs. Tennis and Vs. Baseball, Taito's American football game 10-Yard Fight and golf game Birdie King II, and Data East's Tag Team Wrestling.

Namco's Yoshihiro Kishimoto cited Track & Field as the biggest influence on side-scrolling platform game Pac-Land (1984). The game's controls were heavily influenced by Track & Field, which allowed the player to become faster by constantly tapping the button in succession; Kishimoto thought the idea was interesting and that it would make Pac-Land stand out among other games.

Sequels
Konami continued releasing games in the series:

 Hyper Sports (1984) (Arcade)
 Track & Field 2 / Hyper Olympic 2 (1984) (MSX)
 Konami '88 (1988) (Arcade)
 Track & Field II (1988) (NES)
 Track & Field (1992) (Game Boy)
 International Track & Field (1996) (Arcade, PS, PSN)
 Hyper Olympics in Nagano (1998) (Arcade, N64, PS)
 International Track & Field 2000 (1999) (PS, N64, GBC, DC, PS2)
 Konami Sports Series (2001) (Mobile phones)
 Hyper Sports 2002 Winter (2002) (GC, PS2, Xbox, GBA)
 New International Track & Field (2008) (NDS)
 Hyper Sports Winter (2010) (iPhone OS)
 Hyper Sports Track & Field (2010) (iPhone OS)

Re-releases
The game appears in Konami Classics Series: Arcade Hits for the Nintendo DS, but with an altered version of the Chariots of Fire theme. The Game Boy version was rereleased as part of the Konami GB Collection series.

The Xbox Live Arcade version of the game was released on the Xbox 360 on August 8, 2007, with updated graphics and audio, leaderboards, and online play. It sold 297,307 copies .

On September 12, 2019, the game also appeared on the PlayStation 4 and Nintendo Switch under the Arcade Archives brand.

Notes

References

External links
 
 Twin Galaxies High Score Rankings for Track and Field
 Track and Field entry at the Centuri.net Arcade Database
 

1983 video games
1984 Summer Olympics
Arcade video games
Apple II games
Atari 2600 games
Atari 8-bit family games
Cancelled Atari 5200 games
Commodore 64 games
Head-to-head arcade video games
Konami franchises
Konami games
Mobile games
MSX games
NEC PC-8001 games
Nintendo Entertainment System games
Summer Olympic video games
SG-1000 games
Sharp X1 games
Trackball video games
Video games set in 1984
Video games set in Los Angeles
Xbox 360 Live Arcade games
ZX Spectrum games
Multiplayer and single-player video games
Athletics video games
Konami arcade games
Video games developed in Japan